The Valiant is a 1962 British/Italian international co-production film directed by Roy Ward Baker and starring John Mills, Ettore Manni, Roberto Risso, Robert Shaw, and Liam Redmond. It is based on the Italian manned torpedo attack which seriously damaged the two British battleships Valiant and Queen Elizabeth and the oil tanker Sagona at the port of Alexandria in December 1941.

The film had a Royal Gala Premiere on 4 January 1962 at the Odeon Leicester Square in the presence of Princess Marina, Duchess of Kent.

Plot
Alexandria December, 1941. Two Italian frogmen are captured under suspicion of placing a mine under HMS Valiant. They are brought onto the ship for questioning.

Cast

Production
Roy Ward Baker said he was approached by John Pennington with the script by Willis Hall and Keith Waterhouse. "It was a good script," says Baker. "The two sailors were given some sour wartime humour." The producers wanted John Mills to play the captain and asked Baker "to contact him because we'd made so many pictures together. So, I did and with a certain amount of reluctance Johnny agreed to do it. From that point on we were more or less in business."

Most of the finance came from Italy, where the movie was shot with a British-Italian crew.

See also 
HMS Valiant
Luigi Durand de la Penne
Raid on Alexandria (1941)
The Silent Enemy

References

External links

1962 films
1962 drama films
Italian drama films
British drama films
CinemaScope films
1960s English-language films
Films directed by Roy Ward Baker
Films set in 1941
Films set in Alexandria
British World War II films
Underwater action films
Films set in the Mediterranean Sea
Royal Navy in World War II films
English-language Italian films
1960s British films
1960s Italian films